Sandjar Ahmadi is a footballer from Afghanistan who currently plays for Hamm United FC and Afghanistan national football team. He scored two goals against Sri Lanka in 2011 SAFF Championship which helped the national team to win 3–1. At 21 years of age, Ahmadi is one of the Afghanistan national football team's best players. He scored the winning goal against Laos in the AFC Challenge Cup qualifiers. He scored against Pakistan in a friendly on 20 August 2013. He scored The winning goal against Nepal in the 2013 SAFF Championship to take his nation to the finals. And then in the final he scored the winning goal against the India national football team to earn his country their first ever FIFA tournament win. The team was also granted $50,000 US Dollars for being the champions. In an interview with Afghanistan's captain Zohib Islam Amiri, Amiri said "He is a great player, and we couldn't have won this without him."

Early life
Sandjar Ahmadi was born in Kabul, Afghanistan and then with his family he moved to Germany and now lives in Hamburg. He was seven years only when he started playing football. Now he plays for both club and country on the international level.

Club career
Ahmadi plays for SC Vier- und Marschlande in Oberliga Hamburg. He wears number 12. He is a winger but he also can play as a central forward.

Mumbai FC
Sandjar Ahmadi has scored 2 goals in 9 matches for Mumbai FC in I-League. In an interview, he revealed that he was targeting highest position in I-League with Mumbai FC.

Club career stats
Last update: 14 May 2013

International goals

Scores and results list Afghanistan's goal tally first.

Honours

Afghanistan
SAFF Championship: 2013

References

Afghan men's footballers
1992 births
Living people
Footballers from Kabul
Afghan emigrants to Germany
Afghanistan international footballers
I-League players
Mumbai FC players
Footballers at the 2014 Asian Games
Association football wingers
Asian Games competitors for Afghanistan
Expatriate footballers in India